Love Is the Law is the fifth studio album by British new wave band Toyah, fronted by Toyah Willcox, released in 1983 by Safari Records. It reached number 28 in the UK Albums Chart and included the Top 40 hit single "Rebel Run". It was the last album to be released by the band before singer Willcox embarked on a solo career and retained 'Toyah' as her stage name.

Background
Willcox said the making of the album was the happiest period of her life. She reflected that "in 1983 everything was going right. I was starring in a stage play called Trafford Tanzi, which won me especially huge critical acclaim, and I was about to star in a film, The Ebony Tower with Lord Laurence Olivier just as soon as the album was finished. Because my schedule was incredibly full, the band moved into my house in Finchley, London, where we transformed my gym into a makeshift recording studio to pre-write and programme all the material in the daytime. I'd then go to the theatre for five o'clock and meet the band at the Marquee Studios to do the main recording of the vocals after midnight. It was a killer timetable but I loved it with a passion. (...) Sometimes my head would be racing so much that the only way to get me to calm down was to give me a sleeping pill. This is not something I would readily admit, but it was the only way the producer could get me to sit long enough to finish a track and is the reason "Rebel of Love" and "Martian Cowboy" sound so relaxed for a Toyah song!"

The phrase "love is the law" is from The Book of the Law, the central sacred text of Thelema, written (or received) by Aleister Crowley. "I was never a fan of what he represented, which was mainly dark, devious and debauched, but I thought the phrase 'Love Is the Law' was possibly one of the most beautiful to ever be uttered because it crosses every social and tribal divide", she said. The title track features guest vocals from Toyah fans camping outside the recording studio, who were spontaneously invited in to chant "love is the law" in the song's chorus. "I Explode" was inspired by the idea that Crowley was so powerful as a Satanic person that he managed to explode and disappear, and is "about intense emotions that destroy the essence of who you are". Cover photography was taken by John Swannell.

The album was promoted by two singles: the uptempo "Rebel Run" which was a Top 40 hit and the ballad "The Vow" which only peaked at number 50. The album itself was moderately successful and reached number 28 in the UK Albums Chart. It was supported with the Rebel Run Tour which ran across England in November and December 1983.

Love Is the Law was first released on CD in 2005 with five additional bonus tracks, including B-sides and the standalone single "Be Proud Be Loud (Be Heard)". In 2013, Toyah embarked on the Love Is the Law & More tour to commemorate the 30th anniversary of the album.

Track listing
All songs by Toyah Willcox and Joel Bogen, except where indicated.

Side one
 "Broken Diamonds" – 4:05
 "I Explode" – 4:09
 "Rebel of Love" – 3:42
 "Rebel Run" (Willcox, Simon Darlow) – 3:11
 "Martian Cowboy" (Willcox, Bogen, Darlow, Phil Spalding) – 4:40

Side two
 "Dreamscape" – 5:04
 "Time Is Ours" – 3:38
 "Love Is the Law" (Willcox, Bogen, Darlow, Spalding) – 3:09
 "Remember" (Willcox, Bogen, Darlow) – 4:08
 "The Vow" (Willcox, Bogen, Spalding) – 3:47

2005 CD edition bonus tracks
"Be Proud, Be Loud (Be Heard)" – 3:30
"Laughing with the Fools" – 4:03
"To the Mountains High" – 3:36
"Baptised in Fire" (Willcox) – 2:45
"Haunted" (Willcox, Darlow) – 3:39

Personnel
Band members
 Toyah Willcox – vocals
 Joel Bogen – guitar
 Simon Darlow – keyboards
 Adrian Lee – keyboards on track 11 and 12
 Phil Spalding – bass on tracks 7, 8, 9, 11 and 12
 Brad Lang – bass on tracks 1, 2, 4, 6, 10, 13–15
 Andy Duncan – drums and percussion

Additional musicians
 Preston Heyman – drums on track 11 and 12
 Denys Darlow – string arrangements and conductor on track 10

Production
 Nick Tauber – producer
 Simon Darlow, Joel Bogen – arrangements
 Simon Hanhart, Phil Harding, Mark Wade – engineers
 Andy Lovell, Mike Higgs, Mike Duffy, Rob Waldron – assistant engineers

Charts

References

External links
 Official audio stream on YouTube
 The official Toyah website

1983 albums
Toyah (band) albums